Helen Tamiris (born Helen Becker; April 24, 1905 – August 4, 1966) was an American choreographer, modern dancer, and teacher.

Biography

Tamiris was born in New York City on April 23, 1902. She adopted Tamiris, her stage name, from a fragment of a Persian poem: "Thou art Tamiris, the ruthless queen who banishes all obstacles," a mantra of her career. She was a choreographer known for American themed works. Tamiris originally trained in ballet and musical theater/comedy.  She spent time studying free movement at the Henry Street Settlement. She danced for three seasons with the Metropolitan Opera Ballet and the Bracale Opera Company before studying briefly with Michel Fokine and with a disciple of Isadora Duncan.  In 1927, she made her premiere as a solo modern dancer and two years later formed her own school and company. Not only was she concerned with establishing modern dance as a viable art form, she also wanted to bring dance to a wider audience.

Tamiris was married to modern dancer and choreographer Daniel Nagrin who wrote the book How to Dance Forever: Surviving Against the Odds. Tamiris and Nagrin directed the Tamiris-Nagrin Dance Company.

Much of her known works deal with social issues like racism and war. She is best known for her suite of dances called Negro Spirituals which was created between 1928 and 1942. She choreographed eight Negro Spirituals, which were performed at the Brooklyn Academy of Music in April, 1939 with six other short dances, in a program shared with Hanya Holm. These Negro Spirituals protested against prejudice and discrimination against African American in America.  How Long Brethren? (1937) was danced to Negro protest songs. This was a production of the Federal Dance Project of the Works Progress Administration (WPA) that explored the problems facing African-Americans (which was the first time that federal funds were utilized in a creation of American dance). Other dancers and choreographers who took part in the Federal Dance Project were Katherine Dunham, Doris Humphrey, Ruth Page, and Charles Weidman. How Long Brethren? won Dance Magazine's first award for group choreography.

Tamiris was active in organizing the young artists through the Concert Dancers League, Dance Repertory Theatre, with contributions from Martha Graham, Doris Humphrey, and Charles Weidman,  Dancers Emergency Association, and American Dance Association.  She also played an integral role in establishing the Federal Dance Project under the WPA. Later, she became the director of the Federal Theatre Project under WPA. During the Depression she assisted many dancers with finding work and career opportunities.

Helen Tamiris was Jewish and she choreographed some pieces with themes that reflected her heritage in this regard, such as Memoir (1959) and Women's Song (1960).

Tamiris was also known for her contribution to musical theatre. During a period when jobs opportunities for dancers started to decrease, a number of ballet and modern dance choreographers, including Tamiris, began to work in musical theatre, musical comedies, and films. Tamiris was among the choreographers who won awards for their musical theatre choreography. Tamiris won an Antoinette Perry Award (Tony) for best choreography in Touch and Go (1949). Her other musical theatre choreography includes Adelante (1939), Annie Get Your Gun (1946),  Up in Central Park (1947), Flahooley (1951), Carnival in Flanders (1953), Fanny (1954), and Plain and Fancy (1955).

Tamiris believed that each dance must create its own expressive means and as such did not develop an individual style or technique. She was one of the first choreographers to use jazz and spiritual music to explore social themes via dance. Tamiris also made works based on American themes working in concert dance (including Walt Whitman Suite and Salut au Monde).

See also
Women in dance

References

External links
 
 

1900s births
1966 deaths
American choreographers
20th-century American Jews
Modern dancers
Artists from New York City
Federal Theatre Project people